Sir Godfrey Russell Vick QC (24 December 1892 – 27 September 1958) was an English lawyer, judge and Liberal Party politician.

Background
Vick was born at Strathmore House, West Hartlepool, the youngest son of Richard William Vick JP and Emily née Oughtred. He was educated at The Leys School and Jesus College, Cambridge. He played rugby for Hartlepool Rovers. He married Marjorie Hester Compston and the couple had two daughters and two sons, the younger of whom, Arnold Russell, also became a barrister and judge.

Professional career
In August 1914 he joined the 11th Battalion of the Durham Light Infantry serving during World War I in France and Flanders. He was called to the bar at the Inner Temple in 1917, and practised successfully, on the North East circuit, largely as a criminal lawyer. He served both as Chairman of the Bar Council and variously as a recorder in Richmond (1930-1931), Halifax (1931-1939) and Newcastle-upon-Tyne (1939-1956). In 1935 he was appointed a King's Counsel. He was subsequently made a county court judge, and became a bencher of the Inner Temple. He was knighted in the 1950 King's Birthday Honours List. 

His service on public enquiries included:
London County Council remand homes (1944);
The black market in petrol (1948);
Lynskey tribunal into political corruption (1948);
Ill-treatment of prisoners at HM Prison Liverpool (1958).

Political career
He contested the constituency of Bishop Auckland at the 1918 General Election for the Coalition Liberals and finished second.

In 1919 he contested the constituency of Shoreditch in the 1919 London County Council election. He ran for the Liberal backed Progressive Party and narrowly missed out on election.

He contested the constituency of The Hartlepools at the 1945 General Election for the Liberal Party and finished third.

Electoral record

References

Bibliography
Home Office (1945) "London County Council remand homes: report of Committee of Inquiry" Cmd.6594
Home Office (1958) "Allegations of Ill-Treatment of Prisoners in Her Majesty's Prison, Liverpool" Cmnd.503
Ministry of Fuel and Power.Committee on Petrol Rationing Control (1948) "Evasions of petrol rationing control" Cmd.7372

Who Was Who 1897-2006 (2007) "Vick, His Honour Judge Sir Godfrey Russell", retrieved 25 August 2007 (subscription required)

1892 births
1958 deaths
Alumni of Jesus College, Cambridge
British Army personnel of World War I
Durham Light Infantry officers
Members of the Inner Temple
English barristers
Liberal Party (UK) parliamentary candidates
Knights Bachelor
20th-century English judges
County Court judges (England and Wales)